Dzmitry Syarheyevich Nabokau (born January 20, 1996, in Byalynichy) is a Belarusian high jumper. He competed at the 2016 Summer Olympics in the men's high jump event; his result of 2.17 meters in the qualifying round did not qualify him for the final.
2014 world junior silver medalist. 2017 european u23 champion. 
Personal Best indoor 2.32 m, outdoor 2.36 m.
He established the national record with 2.36 m (2018 Brest).

In November 2019, Nabokau was provisionally suspended after testing positive for the banned substance Furosemide.

References

1996 births
Living people
Belarusian male high jumpers
Olympic athletes of Belarus
Athletes (track and field) at the 2016 Summer Olympics
People from Byalynichy District
Athletes (track and field) at the 2020 Summer Olympics
Sportspeople from Mogilev Region